The 1958–59 La Liga season was the 28th since its establishment. The season started on September 14, 1958, and finished on April 19, 1959.

Competition format
For this season, the relegation play-offs were re-established. 13th and 14th qualified teams would play a double-legged playoff against the second qualified teams of the two groups of Segunda División.

Team locations

Sevilla inaugurated this season the Ramón Sánchez Pizjuán Stadium.

League table

Results

Relegation play-offs

|}

Pichichi Trophy

External links
 Official LFP Site

1958 1959
1958–59 in Spanish football leagues
Spain